James Blaine Baskette (December 10, 1887 – July 30, 1942) was a Major League Baseball pitcher who played for three seasons. He played for the Cleveland Naps.

External links

1887 births
1942 deaths
Cleveland Naps players
Major League Baseball pitchers
Baseball players from Tennessee
Chattanooga Lookouts players
Toledo Mud Hens players
Cleveland Bearcats players
Kansas City Blues (baseball) players
Memphis Chickasaws players
People from Athens, Tennessee
Florence Fiddlers players